Ragab Moursi Elbanna (born September 17, 1936) is an Egyptian editor and publishing executive who is a member of the Egyptian Society of Economics and Political Science.

Background

Elbanna, Ragab was born on September 17, 1936 in Damanhour, El Behira, Egypt. Son of Moursi El Banna.

Education

Bachelor in Sociology and Philosophy, Alexandria University, Egypt, 1960. 
Diploma in journalism, Cairo University, 1971.

Career

Corresponding, writer Al Ahram newspaper, Cairo, 1971—1980, 
assistant editor-in-chief, 1980—1987, 
vice editor-in-chief, 1987—1994
Editor-in-chief, writer October magazine, 1994 - 2005.
Chairman Dar Al Maaref Public House, 1994 - 2005.

Member, National Committee for Culture, Art and Literature, Cairo, Higher Council of Islamic Affairs, Cairo
Professor journalism Cairo University, 1974

Works

Author: 
1- History Not For Sale
2- Looking for Future
3- Religious Illiteracy and War Against Islam
4- Little Smile (Short Stories)
5- The West and Islam
6- History of Copts in Egypt
7- A Trip to China
8- Miracles of Creation and the Creator
9- Making Enmity to Islam
10- America, A View Inside
11- Heikal, Between Journalism and Politics
12- Sunnies and Shiites 
. Weekly columnist: Al Ahram, since 1970.

website

References

1936 births
Egyptian editors
Living people